Stephanopachys is a genus of horned powder-post beetles in the family Bostrichidae. There are more than 20 described species in Stephanopachys.

Species
These 21 species belong to the genus Stephanopachys:

 Stephanopachys ambericus Zahradník & Háva, 2015
 Stephanopachys amplus (Casey, 1898)
 Stephanopachys asperulus (Casey, 1898)
 Stephanopachys brunneus (Wollaston, 1862)
 Stephanopachys conicola Fisher, 1950
 Stephanopachys cribratus (LeConte, 1866)
 Stephanopachys densus (LeConte, 1866)
 Stephanopachys dugesi Lesne, 1939
 Stephanopachys electron Zahradník & Háva, 2015
 Stephanopachys himalayanus Lesne, 1932
 Stephanopachys hispidulus (Casey, 1898)
 Stephanopachys linearis (Kugelann, 1792)
 Stephanopachys opacus Casey
 Stephanopachys pacificus Casey
 Stephanopachys parvulus Casey
 Stephanopachys quadricollis (Fairmaire in Marseul, 1878)
 Stephanopachys rugosus (Olivier, 1795)
 Stephanopachys sachalinensis (Matsumura, 1911)
 Stephanopachys sobrinus (Casey, 1898)
 Stephanopachys substriatus (Paykull, 1800) (powder-post beetle)
 Stephanopachys vetus Peris, Delclòs, Soriano & Perrichot, 2014

References

Further reading

External links

 

Bostrichidae
Articles created by Qbugbot